Leonard Carpenter Meeker (April 4, 1916 – November 29, 2014) was an American politician, lawyer and diplomat who served as the U.S. Ambassador to Romania. He was the father of Sarah Meeker Jensen FAIA and Charles Meeker, 34th Mayor of Raleigh, North Carolina.

Early life and education 
Meeker graduated from Deerfield Academy and Amherst College, and went on to graduate from Harvard Law School, where he was on the board of editors of the Harvard Law Review.

Government service 
During World War II, Meeker worked behind Communist lines in China in the Office of Strategic Services. He was honorably discharged from the United States Army in 1946 with the rank of First lieutenant. After the war ended, he began work as a lawyer at the United States Department of the Treasury and later in the office of the Solicitor General of the United States.

During the Kennedy Administration, Meeker worked as an advisor to U.S. Secretary of State Dean Rusk and helped President Kennedy defuse the Cuban Missile Crisis. Meeker went on to serve as a legal advisor to President Lyndon B Johnson. During his time as an advisor, he worked on treaties with Austria, a peace treaty with Japan, and on a variety of United Nations affairs.

In 1969, Meeker was nominated by President Richard Nixon to serve as ambassador to Romania. He left the role after Nixon's 1972 re-election.

Later life 
After retirement from government service, Meeker worked as an attorney for the Center for Law and Social Policy in Washington, D.C., where he practiced law in the federal courts on matters related to the environment, consumer protection, and human rights.

Meeker also served as chairman of the board of the Contemporary Music Forum and as a member of the boards of the Union of Concerned Scientists and National Academy of Sciences. In 1986, Meeker attended a conference in Moscow on a comprehensive ban of Nuclear weapons testing.

In 2007, Meeker published a three-volume set of his views on life, titled Philosophy and Politics, Experiences and Stories.

References 

1916 births
2014 deaths
20th-century American politicians
Nixon administration personnel
Kennedy administration personnel
Lyndon B. Johnson administration personnel
Ambassadors of the United States to Romania
People from Montclair, New Jersey
North Carolina Democrats
Cuban Missile Crisis
Harvard Law School alumni
Deerfield Academy alumni
Amherst College alumni